For other inequalities named after Wirtinger, see Wirtinger's inequality.

In mathematics, the Wirtinger inequality, named after Wilhelm Wirtinger, is a fundamental result in complex linear algebra which relates the symplectic and volume forms of a hermitian inner product. It has important consequences in complex geometry, such as showing that the normalized exterior powers of the Kähler form of a Kähler manifold are calibrations.

Statement
Then for any orthonormal vectors  there is

Proof

In the special case , the Wirtinger inequality is a special case of the Cauchy–Schwarz inequality:

Let  be fixed, and let  denote their span.

where  denotes the inclusion map from  into . This implies

which in turn implies

where the inequality follows from the previously-established  case. If equality holds, then according to the  equality case, it must be the case that  for each .

Finally, the dependence of the quantity

Consequences
Given a complex manifold with hermitian metric, the Wirtinger theorem immediately implies that for any -dimensional embedded submanifold , there is

where  is the Kähler form of the metric. Furthermore, equality is achieved if and only if  is a complex submanifold. In the special case that the hermitian metric satisfies the Kähler condition, this says that  is a calibration for the underlying Riemannian metric, and that the corresponding calibrated submanifolds are the complex submanifolds of complex dimension . This says in particular that every complex submanifold of a Kähler manifold is a minimal submanifold, and is even volume-minimizing among all submanifolds in its homology class.

Using the Wirtinger inequality, these facts even extend to the more sophisticated context of currents in Kähler manifolds.

See also
Gromov's inequality for complex projective space
Systolic geometry

Notes

References

 
 
 

Inequalities
Differential geometry
Systolic geometry